Mohammed Atta may refer to:

Mohamed Atta (1968–2001), Egyptian Islamic terrorist and one of the ringleaders in planning the September 11 attacks
Atta Muhammad Nur (born 1964), provincial governor in Afghaneistan
Mahmoud Mahmoud Atta (born 1954), American Arab responsible for a 1986 bus bombing in the West Bank